Szőlőskislak (also Szőllőskislak, Szőlős-Kislak) was a village in Somogy County, Hungary, but is now part of Balatonboglár.

People 
 Theodore von Kármán (Hungarian-American aerospace engineer and physicist. Full name refers to the Kármán family of Szőllőskislak)

Former municipalities of Hungary